The Pará-class destroyer is a class of destroyers of the Brazilian Navy.

Development 

After World War II, they were in a mothball state, but were later handed over to Brazil based on the Brazil-US Ship Loan Agreement. The ships took part in the Lobster War, in the 1960s, while escorting the aircraft carrier Minas Gerais. All 7 ships were delivered in batches of 2 at a time, thus the ships having different armaments and configurations.

Ships in the class

References

Bibliography 
 

Destroyer classes
 
Destroyers of the Cold War